Events in the year 2001 in China.

Incumbents 
 Party General Secretary – Jiang Zemin
 President – Jiang Zemin
 Premier – Zhu Rongji
 Vice President – Hu Jintao
 Vice Premier – Li Lanqing
 Congress Chairman – Li Peng
 Conference Chairman – Li Ruihuan

Governors  
 Governor of Anhui Province – Xu Zhonglin 
 Governor of Fujian Province – Xi Jinping 
 Governor of Gansu Province – Song Zhaosu then Lu Hao 
 Governor of Guangdong Province – Lu Ruihua 
 Governor of Guizhou Province – Qian Yunlu then Shi Xiushi 
 Governor of Hainan Province – Wang Xiaofeng 
 Governor of Hebei Province – Niu Maosheng
 Governor of Heilongjiang Province – Song Fatang 
 Governor of Henan Province – Li Keqiang 
 Governor of Hubei Province – Jiang Zhuping then Zhang Guoguang 
 Governor of Hunan Province – Chu Bo then Zhang Yunchuan 
 Governor of Jiangsu Province – Ji Yunshi
 Governor of Jiangxi Province – Shu Shengyou then Huang Zhiquan 
 Governor of Jilin Province – Hong Hu 
 Governor of Liaoning Province – Zhang Guoguang then Bo Xilai 
 Governor of Qinghai Province – Zhao Leji 
 Governor of Shaanxi Province – Cheng Andong 
 Governor of Shandong Province – Zhang Gaoli then Han Yuqun 
 Governor of Shanxi Province – Liu Zhenhua 
 Governor of Sichuan Province – Zhang Zhongwei 
 Governor of Yunnan Province – Li Jiating (until June), Xu Rongkai (starting June)
 Governor of Zhejiang Province – Chai Songyue

Events

January
 January 9 – Shenzhou 2, an unmanned Chinese spacecraft, was launched.

March 

 March 16 – Shijiazhuang bombings

April
 April 1 – Hainan Island incident: a mid-air collision between an EP-3E United States Navy spyplane and a People's Liberation Army Navy People's Liberation Army J-8II interceptor fighter jet 70 miles (110 km) away from the PRC-controlled island of Hainan. The collision caused the death of a PRC pilot, while the EP-3 was forced to make an unauthorized emergency landing at Lingshui airfield. The incident results in an international dispute between the United States and the People's Republic of China.
 April 11 – Hainan Island incident: The detained crew of a United States EP-3E aircraft that landed in Hainan, People's Republic of China, after a collision with an F-8 fighter, is released.

July
 July 13 – The International Olympic Committee awards the 2008 Summer Olympics to Beijing, People's Republic of China
 July 16 – The People's Republic of China and the Russian Federation sign the Treaty of Good-Neighborliness and Friendly Cooperation.

December
 December 13 - SM City Xiamen, the first SM Mall in the Chinese mainland was opened.
 December 27 – The People's Republic of China is granted permanent normal trade status with the United States.

Full date unknown
 Xiao-i (Shanghai Xiaoi Robot Technology Co. Ltd), an artificial intelligence company is founded.

Births
 February 21 - Yang Peiyi, singer
 March 12 – Shi Cong, gymnast
 November 22 – Zhong Chenle, singer

See also 
 List of Chinese films of 2001
 Hong Kong League Cup 2001–02

References 

 
Years of the 21st century in China
China
2000s in China
China